Holmes County Airport  is a public airport located two miles southwest of Millersburg, Ohio, United States. It is owned and operated by the Holmes County Airport Authority.

Facilities and aircraft 
For the 12-month period ending July 27, 2013, the airport had 21,500 aircraft operations: 93% general aviation, 4.6% military and 2.4% air taxi.

References

External links 

County airports in Ohio